Sligo/Leitrim Independent Socialist Organisation (SLISO) was a minor political party led by Sligo County Councillor Declan Bree. It was set up in 1974 and contested local elections to Sligo County Council and Dáil Éireann elections for the Sligo–Leitrim constituency. The group stood other candidates but Bree was the only candidate ever elected for the group. In 1991 the group merged with the Labour Party and Bree was elected as a Labour Party TD at the 1992 general election. Bree resigned from the Labour Party in 2007.

References

Political parties established in 1974
Political parties disestablished in 1991
Defunct political parties in the Republic of Ireland
Socialist parties in Ireland
1974 establishments in Ireland
Irish republican parties
1991 disestablishments in Ireland